Justiniano Borgoño Castañeda (September 5, 1836 – January 27, 1921) was a Peruvian soldier and politician who briefly served as Interim Caretaker of Peru, officially as the President of the Government Junta, during 1894.

Borgoño was born in Trujillo, Peru, and became a military officer, fighting in the War of the Pacific.  

He entered politics as a member of the Constitutional Party. He served as the second vice president from 1890 to 1894. Upon the death of Remigio Morales Bermúdez in 1894, Borgoño was appointed caretaker president until the next election. He was succeeded as President by Andrés Avelino Cáceres.  He died in Lima, Peru.

See also 
 List of presidents of Peru

References 

1836 births
1921 deaths
Peruvian people of Spanish descent
Presidents of Peru
Vice presidents of Peru